Harry Cunningham was a Negro league pitcher in the 1930s.

Cunningham made his Negro leagues debut in 1930 with the Memphis Red Sox. He played with Memphis through 1932, and made a brief appearance for the club again in 1937.

References

External links
 and Seamheads

Place of birth missing
Place of death missing
Year of birth missing
Year of death missing
Memphis Red Sox players
Baseball pitchers